Indraadip Dasgupta (born 17 January 1973) is an Indian composer  whose range of music is well known in various Bengali Films.

In 2017 he worked with Anu Malik in Begum Jaan, composed the film background music .

Film director

Music director (Bengali films)

Music director (Hindi films)

Background Score
 2017 Begum Jaan

Music Director
 2020 Babloo Bachelor

Awards 
 2008 Anandalok Award nomination for Bor Asbe Ekhuni
 2010 Anandolok Purashkar nomination for Le Chakka
 Mirchi Music Awards Bangla 2011 for best Background Score at Bengali film Baishe Srabon
 Mirchi Music Awards Bangla for best album 'Mon Fakira'
 Star guide film award for best music director 2011 for Chaplin
 Mirchi Music Awards Bangla 2016 for Best Popular Soundtrack for Parbona Ami Chartey Tokey
 Bengal Film Journalists' Association - Best Music Director Award 2018 for Sahaj Paather Gappo
 West Bengal Film Journalists' Association – Best Music Director Award 2019 for Ek Je Chhilo Raja
 2019 Special Jury Award at the 66th National Film Awards for Bengali film Kedara

See also 
 Harabo Toke, romantic Bengali song

References

1973 births
Indian film score composers
Living people
Music directors
Musicians from Kolkata
21st-century Indian composers
Bengali film score composers